Butler Machine Tool Co Ltd v Ex-Cell-O Corp (England) Ltd [1977] EWCA Civ 9 is a leading English contract law case. It concerns the problem found among some large businesses, with each side attempting to get their preferred standard form agreements to be the basis for a contract.

Facts
Butler Machine Tool Co Ltd made and sold machine tools. They sent a letter to Ex-Cell-O on May 23, 1969, offering Ex-Cell-O some new machinery for £75,535. With it were Butler's standard contract terms. These included a price variation clause so that if their manufacturing costs went up, the price rise would be passed on to Ex-Cell-O. Ex-Cell-O replied on May 27 and said they would order the machinery, but on Ex-Cell-O's own standard terms. Ex-Cell-O's standard terms did not have a price variation clause. Butler replied on June 5. It replied on the tear-off slip from Ex-Cell-O's terms. At the bottom of this slip it read, "We accept your order on the terms and conditions stated therein." But Butler added a letter reasserting that the deal was being made under Butler's own terms, from the May 23 letter. A while later, nothing further had been said, and Butler delivered the machinery. They asked for £75,535, plus £2,892 according to their price variation clause. Ex-Cell-O refused to pay the extra. Butler sued Ex-Cell-O.

Judgment
The Court of Appeal held that the contract was on Ex-Cell-O's terms, and therefore the increase in price was ineffective. The majority followed a traditional offer and acceptance analysis. But Lord Denning MR's judgment took the approach that one should look for material agreement and the court should have the power to ignore irreconcilable terms. His judgment led as follows.

Lawton LJ concurred.

Bridge LJ agreed with the result.

Significance
As a result of the majority ruling in the Butler Machine Tool case, English law continues to approach the issue of the battle of forms from the viewpoint of analysing the communication between the parties to see if it can be discerned into an offer and acceptance.

An example of a different theoretical approach to resolving the "battle of forms" issue can be found in Article 19 of the Vienna Convention for the International Sale of Goods, which provides:
 A reply to an offer which purports to be an acceptance but contains additions, limitations or other modifications is a rejection of the offer and constitutes a counter-offer.
 However, a reply to an offer which purports to be an acceptance but contains additional or different terms which do not materially alter the terms of the offer constitutes an acceptance, unless the offeror, without undue delay, objects orally to the discrepancy or dispatches a notice to that effect. If he does not so object, the terms of the contract are the terms of the offer with the modifications contained in the acceptance.
 Additional or different terms relating, among other things, to the price, payment, quality and quantity of the goods, place and time of delivery, extent of one party's liability to the other or the settlement of disputes are considered to alter the terms of the offer materially.

Please note: The United Nations Convention on Contracts for the International Sales of Goods has been ratified by 78 states. The United Kingdom is not one of those 78 states.

See also
Agreement in English law

References

1977 in case law
Lord Denning cases
English agreement case law
1977 in British law
Court of Appeal (England and Wales) cases